The 193rd Ohio Infantry Regiment, sometimes 193rd Ohio Volunteer Infantry (or 193rd OVI) was an infantry regiment in the Union Army during the American Civil War.

Service
The 193rd Ohio Infantry was organized at Camp Chase in Columbus, Ohio in March, 1865, and mustered in for one year service under the command of Colonel Eugene Powell.

The regiment was ordered to Harpers Ferry, West Virginia, and assigned to 2nd Brigade, 1st Provisional Division, Army of the Shenandoah, March 20. Marched to Charleston March 21, and duty there until April 4. Transferred to 2nd Brigade, 2nd Provisional Division, March 27. Moved to Winchester April 4, and duty there until August 1865.

The 193rd Ohio Infantry mustered out of service August 4, 1865, at Winchester, Virginia.

Casualties
The regiment lost a total of 29 enlisted men during service, all due to disease.

Commanders
 Colonel Eugene Powell

See also

 List of Ohio Civil War units
 Ohio in the Civil War

References
 Dyer, Frederick H. A Compendium of the War of the Rebellion (Des Moines, IA:  Dyer Pub. Co.), 1908.
 Ohio Roster Commission. Official Roster of the Soldiers of the State of Ohio in the War on the Rebellion, 1861–1865, Compiled Under the Direction of the Roster Commission (Akron, OH: Werner Co.), 1886–1895.
 Reid, Whitelaw. Ohio in the War: Her Statesmen, Her Generals, and Soldiers (Cincinnati, OH: Moore, Wilstach, & Baldwin), 1868. 
Attribution

External links
 Ohio in the Civil War: 193rd Ohio Volunteer Infantry by Larry Stevens
 National flag of the 193rd Ohio Infantry
 Regimental flag of the 193rd Ohio Infantry

Military units and formations established in 1865
Military units and formations disestablished in 1865
Units and formations of the Union Army from Ohio
1865 establishments in Ohio